Méphisto is the title of a 1931 French film serial co-directed by Henri Debain and Georges Vinter, starring Jean Gabin and René Navarre. It was Gabin's first role in a long and illustrious career, as well as Viviane Elder's first role. The music was by Casimir Oberfeld with lyrics by Charles L. Pothier, sung by Jean Gabin.

Cast
 Jean Gabin as Jacques Miral
 Rene Navarre as Prof. Bergmann
 Janine Ronceray as Hilda Bergmann
 Vivianne Elder as Monique Aubray
 Lucien Callamand as Fortune Bidon
 Andre Marnay as Richard
 Helene Terpse as La Femme X
 Mathilde Alberti as Madame Palmarede
 Alexandre Mihalesco as Nostradamus
 Paul Clerget as Cornelius
 Fernand Godeau as Eduoard
 France Dehlia as Fanoche
 Milly Mathis as telegraph customer
 Jacques Maury as Willy
 Jean-Marie de L'isle as Le juge d'instruction
 Louis Zellas as Le dogue de Bordeaux

Chapter titles
 La mariée d'un jour
 Le furet de la tour pointue
 Les forains mystérieux (The Mysterious Fairgrounds)
 La revanche de l'amour (The Revenge of Love)

References

External links
 

1931 films
1930s French-language films
French black-and-white films
Films directed by Henri Debain
Film serials
1930s French films